Mohamed Saidi is a Moroccan professional footballer, who plays as a defender for Wydad Casablanca.

International career
In January 2014, coach Hassan Benabicha, invited him to be a part of the Moroccan squad for the 2014 African Nations Championship. He helped the team to top group B after drawing with Burkina Faso and Zimbabwe and defeating Uganda. The team was eliminated from the competition at the quarter final zone after losing to Nigeria.

Honours

International
Morocco
Islamic Solidarity Games: 2013

References

1994 births
Living people
Moroccan footballers
Footballers from Casablanca
Morocco A' international footballers
2014 African Nations Championship players
Wydad AC players
Association football defenders
Mediterranean Games gold medalists for Morocco
Mediterranean Games medalists in football
Competitors at the 2013 Mediterranean Games